was a Japanese daimyō of the late-Edo period.  In the Edo period, the Makino were identified as one of the fudai or insider daimyō clans which were hereditary vassals or allies of the Tokugawa clan, in contrast with the tozama or outsider clans.

Inaba clan genealogy
The fudai Inaba clan originated in Mino Province.   They claim descent from Kōno Michitaka (d. 1374), who claimed descent from Emperor Kammu (736–805).  Masakuni was part of the cadet branch of the Inaba which was created in 1588. This branch is descended from Inaba Masanari, who fought in the armies of  Nobunaga and then Hideyoshi.  In 1619, Masanari was granted the han of Itoigawa (25,000 koku) in Echigo Province; then, in 1627, his holding was transferred to Mōka Domain (65,000 koku) in Shimotsuke Province.  Masanari's descendants resided successively at Odawara Domain (105,000 koku) in Sagami Province from 1632 through 1685; at Takata Domain in Echigo Province from 1685 through 1701; at Sakura Domain in Shimōsa Province from 1701 through 1723.

Masakuni's heirs and others who were also descendants of Inaba Masanari settled at Yodo Domain (115,000 koku) in Yamashiro Province from 1723 through 1868.  The head of this clan line was ennobled as a "Viscount" in the Meiji period.

Tokugawa official
Masakuni served in a variety of positions in the Tokugawa shogunate.  He was the shōgun's representative, the  Kyoto shoshidai in the period spanning July 26, 1863, through May 16, 1864. During the Battle of Toba–Fushimi, he refused the entry of pro-Shogunate forces into Yodo, and thus helped tip the balance in the favor of the Satsuma and Chōshū forces.

He was made a viscount in the Meiji period, and served as a Shinto priest and government official.

Notes

References
 Appert, Georges and H. Kinoshita. (1888).  Ancien Japon. Tokyo: Imprimerie Kokubunsha.
 Hank, Patrick, ed. (2003).  Dictionary of American Family Names. New York: Oxford University Press.  (cloth)
 Meyer, Eva-Maria. (1999). Japans Kaiserhof in de Edo-Zeit: Unter besonderer Berücksichtigung der Jahre 1846 bis 1867. Münster: Tagenbuch. 
 Papinot, Jacques Edmond Joseph. (1906) Dictionnaire d'histoire et de géographie du japon. Tokyo: Librarie Sansaisha...Click link for digitized 1906 Nobiliaire du japon (2003)
 Sasaki, Suguru. (2002). Boshin sensō: haisha no Meiji ishin. Tokyo: Chūōkōron-shinsha.

External links
 National Diet Library: NDL call number: YDM23880, photo of Edo residence of Yodo (Inaba) clan

|-

People from Tokyo
Rōjū
Kannushi
Kyoto Shoshidai
Japanese Shintoists
People of the Boshin War
Kazoku
1834 births
1898 deaths
Inaba clan
Fudai daimyo